DD Science is a 2019 Indian science television series that aired on national television Doordarshan. It is a one-hour program on science and technology created by Vigyan Prasar, an autonomous organization under the Department of Science and Technology (DST), in association with the public broadcaster, Doordarshan.

Overview 
DD Science is a Hindi-language show that aims to spread scientific awareness among people in India. It was launched by Prasar Bharati, an Indian public broadcasting agency on January 15, 2019. DD Science programs consist of science-based documentaries, studio-based discussions, virtual walkthroughs of scientific institutions, interviews, and short films.

Episodes

References

External links 
 DD Science on YouTube

Hindi-language television shows
DD National original programming
Indian television series
2019 Indian television series debuts